Vladimir Tkachyov may refer to:

Vladimir Tkachyov (ice hockey, born 1993) (also known as Vladimir A. Tkachyov)
Vladimir Tkachyov (ice hockey, born 1995) (also known as Vladimir E. Tkachyov)